Tobaniviridae is a family of enveloped, positive-strand RNA viruses in the order Nidovirales which infect vertebrates. Host organisms include mammals, fish, and snakes. The genome size of tobaniviruses ranges from 20 to 32 kilobases. The family is the only member of the suborder Tornidovirineae.

Taxonomy
The family Tobaniviridae has four subfamilies and eight genera: 
Piscanivirinae
Bafinivirus
Oncotshavirus
Remotovirinae
Bostovirus
Serpentovirinae
Infratovirus
Pregotovirus
Sectovirus
Tiruvirus
Torovirinae
Torovirus

References

Virus families
Nidovirales